Recurvaria francisca is a moth of the family Gelechiidae. It is found in North America, where it has been recorded from California.

The larvae feed on Ceanothus thyrsiflorus.

References

Moths described in 1928
Recurvaria
Moths of North America